Wila may refer to:

Wila (lichen)
Wila or Vila, Slavic fairies#Vila
Wila, Missouri, a ghost town 
Wila, Switzerland, a municipality 
Wila railway station
Wila' language, the name of several extinct Malayan languages
Polo Wila, an Ecuadorian footballer

See also
WILA (disambiguation)
Willa (disambiguation)